Eleven Days or 11 Days may refer to:

Eleven Days (novel), a 2013 novel by Lea Carpenter
Eleven Days, an autobiographical account of a kidnapping by Brianda Domecq
Eleven Days, a 1999 crime novel by Donald Harstad 
Eleven Days, a 2013 crime novel by Stav Sherez

See also
"Give us back our eleven days", claimed by some history books to be a demand made by rioters after Great Britain adopted the Gregorian calendar in 1752
 Eleven Days War (disambiguation)